Jassim Mohammed Ghulam Al Hamd (born March 11, 1979 in Baghdad, Iraq) is an Iraqi former  professional footballer who last played for Al-Quwa Al-Jawiya in Iraq.

Information
A tall defender, Ghulam was a member of the victorious squad in the 2000 AFC Youth Championship. After 
starting his career with Al Jaish, he joined Al Zawraa before moving to Al Quwa Al Jawiya. In 2001, Jassim was surprisingly brought into the 2002 World Cup qualifying squad by Adnan Hamad after the sacking of Milan Zivadinovic, but he was not called into the final squad until Sadiq Saadoun and Sabah Jeayer were not fit enough to travel to Kazakhstan, making his debut in the 4-2 win over Nepal. 

In August 2006, he left Al Quwa Al Jawiya to join Jordan’s Al Baqaa before recently moving to Jordanian league champions Al Wihdat. In 2007 Ghulam played all 6 matches with Iraq national team to win the Asian cup for the first time in history. He played a big role in defence alongside Ali Rehema, Bassim Abbas and Haidar Abdul-Amir.   
In 2008 Ghulam signed with Aboomoslem.

International goals
Scores and results list Iraq's goal tally first.

Honours

International
 2002 WAFF Champions
 2007 Asian Cup winners

References

External links
 

1981 births
Iraqi footballers
Iraq international footballers
Association football defenders
Iraqi expatriate footballers
Expatriate footballers in Iran
F.C. Aboomoslem players
Al-Zawraa SC players
Living people
Al-Quwa Al-Jawiya players
Expatriate footballers in Jordan
Al-Rayyan SC players
2007 AFC Asian Cup players
AFC Asian Cup-winning players
Al-Shorta SC players
Qatar Stars League players